The 1990 San Jose State Spartans football team represented San Jose State University during the 1990 NCAA Division I-A football season as a member of the Big West Conference. The team was led by head coach Terry Shea, in his first year as head coach at San Jose State. They played home games at Spartan Stadium in San Jose, California. The Spartans finished the 1990 season as Champions of the Big West conference, with a record of nine wins, two losses and one tie (7–0 Big West).

As a result of the Big West championship, the Spartans qualified for a postseason bowl game against the Mid-American Conference (MAC) co-champion Central Michigan Chippewas. The 1990 California Bowl was played in Fresno, California on December 8, with San Jose State winning, 48–24.

Schedule

Rankings

Game summaries

Louisville

at Washington

vs. Central Michigan (California Bowl)

Team players in the NFL
The following were selected in the 1991 NFL Draft.

Notes

References

San Jose State
San Jose State Spartans football seasons
Big West Conference football champion seasons
San Jose State Spartans football